"(We're Not) The Jet Set" is a song recorded by country music duo George Jones and Tammy Wynette.  It was written by country songwriter Bobby Braddock.

Background
Epic released the song as a single in 1974 and it climbed to #15 on the Billboard country charts.  In July 2013 Uncut singled out the performance as a "grand romance."  John Prine covered the song with Iris Dement and it became the opening track on his 1999 LP In Spite of Ourselves.

Chart performance

References

1974 songs
Songs written by Bobby Braddock
Song recordings produced by Billy Sherrill
George Jones songs
Tammy Wynette songs
Epic Records singles
Male–female vocal duets